Adebayo Adefarati (14 February 1931 – 29 March 2007) was a Nigerian politician who was Governor of Ondo State in Nigeria from 1999 to 2003.

Life and career
Adebayo Adefarati was appointed commissioner twice under the Afenifere leader Chief Michael Adekunle Ajasin. He was the State Commissioner for Works and Transport (between 1979–1983). Adefarati was also a prominent member of the National Democratic Coalition (NADECO), a leading organization in the fight against the military during the rule of Sani Abacha.

Political intrigues during his term as governor culminated in the alienation of many of his erstwhile comrades, figures like Olusegun Mimiko, Chief Rufus Giwa, Akerele Adu, Olu Agunloye, Chief Yele Omogunwa, Chief Niyi Omodara, Olatunji Ariyo and Chief Bamidele Awosika.

This state of affairs worked against him when he made a bid for a second term as governor and enhanced the likelihood of victory for Olusegun Agagu at the polls in April, 2003. 
Claims made against Adefarati included disillusionment with his administration and a lack of transparency in the selection process adopted by the Alliance for Democracy in the selection of its gubernatorial candidates at that election.
 
The relationship of Chief Adebayo Adefarati with Chief Ruben Fasoranti and Chief Olu Falae was just being repaired during the election, thereby making the impact of the duo of little consequence in his favour during the Nigerian general elections of 2003. Many of his detractors were to later regret their actions when Olusegun Agagu was himself removed from office by a coalition that included many of the previous players and was replaced by Olusegun Mimiko, thus vindicating Chief Adebayo Adefarati.

During the 1999 Ondo State gubernatorial election, Adefarati was elected Governor from 1999 to 2003. He was later a presidential candidate for the Alliance for Democracy party in the April, 2007 presidential election, but died in Owo, Ondo State at the age of 76 of an undisclosed ailment a few weeks prior to the election. He had not been considered a major candidate, but his death raised the possibility that the election would be delayed. A spokesman for the Independent National Electoral Commission said that this would not happen, and that the party could name a replacement candidate.

Personal life
Adebayo Adefarati was a native of Akungba Akoko and was married to Adetutu Adefarati. As an Oloye of the Yoruba people, he held the traditional titles of the Otunba Elekole of Ikole and the Bobajiro of Osu-Ilesa.

References

1931 births
2007 deaths
Yoruba politicians
Politicians from Ondo State
Governors of Ondo State
National Democratic Coalition (Nigeria) politicians
Alliance for Democracy (Nigeria) politicians
People from Ondo State